Ultraviolence is the third studio album by American singer-songwriter Lana Del Rey, released on June 13, 2014, by Polydor and Interscope Records. Originally dismissing the possibility of releasing another record after her major-label debut Born to Die (2012), Del Rey began planning its follow-up in 2013. Production continued into 2014, at which time she heavily collaborated with Dan Auerbach to revamp what she initially considered to be the completed record. The album saw additional contributions from producers such as Paul Epworth, Greg Kurstin, Daniel Heath, and Rick Nowels, and features a more guitar-based sound than Del Rey's previous releases.

Ultraviolence received critical acclaim, with reviewers praising the album's lyricism, cohesiveness, production and Del Rey's vocal performance. The album was frequently ranked by various publications as among the best albums of the year as well as the decade, with Metacritic citing it as the 13th-most frequently mentioned album in critics "year-end" lists in 2014.  Ultraviolence became a global success, debuting at number one in eleven countries, including the United States with first-week sales of 182,000 copies, becoming the best-selling debut week of Del Rey's career and reached the top five in over twenty territories. 

To promote the album, five singles were released, "West Coast", "Shades of Cool", "Ultraviolence", "Brooklyn Baby" and "Black Beauty". In May 2015, Del Rey embarked on The Endless Summer Tour featuring live shows with singers Courtney Love and Grimes, to support the album. It started on May 7, 2015 and ended on June 16, 2015.

Background and production 
After the release of Born to Die in 2012, Del Rey dismissed the idea of releasing another album, because she had "already said everything [she] wanted to say." However, by February 2013, Del Rey had started work on an album saying, "It's a little more stripped down but still cinematic and dark. I've been working on it really slowly but I love everything I've done. I've been writing in Santa Monica and I know what the record sounds like. Now I just have to finish it. Musically I've worked with the same three guys". She mentioned that one of the songs off the album would be called "Black Beauty". When the demo version leaked in July, Del Rey stated "I do feel discouraged, yeah. I don't really know what to put on the record. But I guess I could just put them on and see what happens. Each time I write... I'll never write a song if I don't think it's going to be perfect for the record." She also stated that she was writing "low-key and stripped back" songs and was working with Dan Heath, her then boyfriend Barrie-James O'Neill and that she wanted to work with Lou Reed.

In October, Del Rey said about the prospect of a new album: "When people ask me about it, I just have to be honest—I really don't know. I don't want to say, 'Yeah, definitely—the next one's better than this one', because I don't really hear a next one. My muse is very fickle. She only comes to me sometimes, which is annoying."

By January 2014, Del Rey and Dan Auerbach were rumored to be working together at Auerbach's Easy Eye Sound recording studio in Nashville, Tennessee, and he was said to be producing her upcoming album.

Del Rey and Auerbach were initially scheduled to work together for three days but ended up spending six weeks recording a full album. On February 20, Del Rey posted a picture of herself and Auerbach on Twitter with the caption: "Me and Dan Auerbach are excited to present you Ultraviolence." About working with Del Rey, Auerbach later said: "She impressed me every day. There were moments when she was fighting me. I could sense that maybe she didn't want to have anybody think she wasn't in control because I'm sure it's really hard to be a woman in the music business. So we bumped heads a little bit, but at the end of the day we were dancing to the songs". The artist stated that the album draws inspiration from the West Coast, as well as from Brooklyn, New York. In addition, it also features heavy guitars and jazz tones. Del Rey also stated that the inclusion of Auerbach was last-minute; the two had met in New York City when she believed that the record was finished. She characterized their time in the studio as having the opportunity to "do what we wanted to do."

On the release of Ultraviolence, she reaffirmed her earlier reluctance to make another album, saying, "I mean, I still feel that way, but with this album I felt less like I had to chronicle my journeys and more like I could just recount snippets in my recent past that felt exhilarating to me".

Content 

The sound of Ultraviolence was characterized as psychedelic rock, dream pop, desert rock with some elements of blues rock, soft rock and indie rock.

The first song on the album, "Cruel World", is the longest song on the album, clocking in at six minutes and thirty-nine seconds. A break-up song, with 70s-style rock guitars and reverb, Del Rey considers this as her favorite track off the album.

In the title track, "Ultraviolence", Del Rey directly references the Crystals' "He Hit Me (And It Felt Like a Kiss)" in the chorus, which she had also heard a rendition of by Hole. "Shades of Cool" was described by Consequence of Sound as "a slow and slightly gloomy ballad marked by reverberated guitars, slight atmospherics, and Del Rey's vocals that alternate between a hushed whisper and ephemeral wailing". The song consists of "a chiming guitar, slow-burn bass line, and swelling orchestra" which surround Del Rey's vocals. Del Rey said that she wrote "Brooklyn Baby" with Lou Reed in mind. She was supposed to work with him and flew to New York City to meet him, but he died the day she arrived. He is referenced in the line "And my boyfriend's in a band/He plays guitar while I sing Lou Reed".

"West Coast" is a mid-tempo song with a psychedelic rock and soft rock verse and a surf rock slow-tempo chorus. Musically, its composition is built around reggae drum fills, blues-influenced guitar riffs, and draws influences from indie rock music.

"Sad Girl" was written about being "the other woman" in an affair. Del Rey wrote "Money Power Glory" as a reaction to her rise to fame. About writing it, she says, "I was in more of a sardonic mood. Like, if all that I was actually going to be allowed to have by the media was money, loads of money, then fuck it... What I actually wanted was something quiet and simple: a writer's community and respect".

"Fucked My Way Up to the Top" was written about an undisclosed female singer who, at first, mocked her for her supposedly unauthentic style, but then "stole and copied it" and became successful with it. Asked about the meaning of the song, Del Rey said, "It's commentary, like, 'I know what you think of me', and I'm alluding to that. You know, I have slept with a lot of guys in the industry, but none of them helped me get my record deals. Which is annoying."

Release and promotion 
During the premiere of her short film Tropico on December 4, 2013, Del Rey explained to the audience that "I really just wanted us all to be together so I could try and visually close out my chapter [of her second studio album Born to Die and third extended play Paradise] before I release the new record, Ultraviolence". Journalists identified the phrase from Anthony Burgess' dystopian novella A Clockwork Orange (1962), although initial reports were conflicting as to whether or not the title would be stylized as the one-word "Ultraviolence" or two-word "Ultra Violence". In February 2014, she mentioned the possibility of releasing the record on May 1, although during her concert in Montreal on May 5 stated that the project would be released the following month.

On May 8, Del Rey announced the track listings for the 11-track standard version and 14-track deluxe version of Ultraviolence. Its black-and-white album artwork depicts Del Rey dressed in a sheer white T-shirt and a white strapless bra while leaning against her Mercedes-Benz 380SL; the title "Ultraviolence" is positioned beneath her image in an all-capitalized typeface, similar to the covers for Born to Die and Paradise. The artwork was unveiled on May 14, along with the confirmation that the record itself would be released on June 17 in the United States. It was made available through the traditional CD, digital download, and vinyl formats, and was additionally distributed in a multi-piece box set; it covers the title "Ultraviolence" in black foil, includes the deluxe record on compact disc and on a two-piece vinyl collection, and is packaged with four photo art cards. Clothing retailer Urban Outfitters offers an exclusive vinyl version of the standard version of Ultraviolence, and features an alternate cover which depicts a close-up of Del Rey's knee in torn jeans as she holds a loose strand of fabric from the torn denim.

Del Rey premiered "West Coast" as part of her set at the Coachella Music Festival on April 13, 2014. "West Coast" was serviced as Ultraviolences lead single the next day. Its music video was released on May 7 and directed by Vincent Haycock. "Shades of Cool" was released as the second single on May 26. A music video was directed by Jake Nava and released on June 17. The third single and title track, "Ultraviolence", was released on June 4 and was followed by the fourth single, "Brooklyn Baby", four days later. The German release of a remixes extended play for "Black Beauty" by Vertigo Berlin was announced for November 21, 2014.

Prior to the album release, Del Rey announced a North American concert tour, as well as performances at several European festivals. Del Rey received attention for taking a "less is more" approach to promoting the album. She did not promote the album with television performances or interviews, instead relying on a couple of print interviews, music videos, and social media. In September, she first cancelled two private concerts for Virgin Radio in Paris, and then the remaining dates of her European tour for medical reasons. Del Rey resumed her tour in the beginning of October with a set at the Austin City Limits Music Festival and headlined gigs in Mexico City and Monterrey between October 6 and 9 and at the Hollywood Forever Cemetery on October 17 and 18. Del Rey announced her 2015 Endless Summer Tour on December 1, 2014, which she headlined with punk vocalist Courtney Love, former frontwoman of alternative rock band Hole. Del Rey released the "Ultraviolence" music video, produced by then boyfriend Francesco Carrozzini, in August 2014.

 Critical reception 

Ultraviolence received a positive critical response following its release. According to review aggregator Metacritic, which assigns a normalized rating out of 100 to reviews from mainstream critics, the album has an average score of 74 out of 100 based on 35 reviews, indicating "generally favorable reviews".

The Guardian writer Alexis Petridis wrote that "Every chorus clicks, the melodies are uniformly beautiful, and they soar and swoop, the better to demonstrate Del Rey's increased confidence in her voice. It's all so well done that the fact that the whole album proceeds at the same, somnambulant pace scarcely matters." Tony Clayton-Lea of The Irish Times noted, "What seems certain is that whatever she really is, or whatever she does in her chosen milieu,  is the best at it." Mike Diver for Clash commented, "For all its lows-inspired highs, Ultraviolence is not quite the complete picture. It goes so far as to reflect, albeit perhaps coincidentally, this era: black and white, the colour has to come from the performance, not the film it's captured on." The critic deemed the album "A bruised beauty, just short of classic status...". Pitchfork's Mark Richardson said that Ultraviolence was a concept album "from a Concept Human", referring to Del Rey's assumed persona. He felt that the album was "gorgeous and rich", and much more cohesive than the earlier Born to Die. At The Independent the album scored 3 out of 5 and critic Hugh Montgomery felt, "Ultraviolence is more of the same, but less. There is quasi-transgressive mixture of hopeless passivity and coquettish sexuality running through songs."

Kyle Anderson of Entertainment Weekly wrote about Del Rey's musical aesthetic on the album, stating, "Kubrick would have loved Del Rey—a highly stylized vixen who romanticizes fatalism to near-pornographic levels, creating fantastically decadent moments of film-noir melodrama. It's an aesthetic that demands total commitment from both artist and listener, and it would be difficult to buy into if she didn't deliver such fully realized cinema". He also added, "Ultraviolence masterfully melds those elements, and completes the redemption narrative of a singer whose breakout-to-backlash arc on 2012's Born to Die made her a cautionary tale of music-industry hype". Caryn Ganz for Rolling Stone gave a positive review, commenting the album "is a melancholy crawl through doomed romance, incorrigible addictions, blown American dreams," although she also wrote " [it] wraps desire, violence and sadness into a tight bundle that Del Rey doesn't always seem sure how to unpack". Despite the 3 1/2 star rating, Rolling Stone named it the seventh best album of 2014 and third best pop album in its annual compilations, later commenting: "Ultraviolence qualifies as a radical statement from a pop star in 2014 – it's mostly produced by Black Keys frontman Dan Auerbach, who relies on electric guitar and other live instruments, and none of its eleven tracks sound much like a potential radio hit." Justin Charity of Complex magazine noted, "Ultraviolence is a blues affair, with moody innuendo spilling bloody and bold as the opening sequence to a vintage Bond saga". The critic also called it 'intimate', 'drunk driven'. Alexandra Molotkow, writing in The Globe and Mail, praised the album as "more vivid, nuanced and ripe than [her debut], Born to Die."

 Year-end lists 
{|class="wikitable plainrowheaders sortable"
|-
! Critic/Publication
! List
! Rank
!scope="col" class="unsortable"| 
|-
!scope="row"| Entertainment Weekly
|10 Best Albums of 2014
|align="center"|4
|align="center"|
|-
!scope="row"|  from NPR
|Top 9 Albums of 2014
|align="center"|4
|align="center"|
|-
!scope="row"| Billboard
|The 14 Best Pop Albums of 2014
|align="center"|14
|align="center"|
|-
!scope="row"|  from The Boston Globe
| Best Albums of 2014
|align="center"|1
|align="center"|
|-
!scope="row"| Cosmopolitan
| 20 Best Albums of 2014
| align=center| 7
|align="center"|
|-
!scope="row"| Digital Spy
| Top 15 Albums of 2014
| align=center| 14
|align="center"|
|-
!scope="row"| NME
| ''NMEs Top 50 Albums of 2014
| align="center"|25
| align="center"|
|-
!scope="row"| Rolling Stone| 50 Best Albums of 2014
| align=center| 7
|align="center"|
|-
!scope="row"| Rolling Stone| 20 Best Pop Albums of 2014
| 
| 
|-
!scope="row"| Slant Magazine| The 25 Best Albums of 2014
| align=center| 3
|align="center"|
|-
!scope="row"| Spin| The 20 Best Pop Albums of 2014
| align=center| 5
|align="center"|
|-
!scope="row"| Time| Top 10 Best Albums of 2014
| align=center|5
|align="center"|
|-
|}

According to Metacritic, Ultraviolence was 13th-most frequently mentioned album in critics "year-end" lists in 2014.

 Decade-end lists 

 Commercial performance 
On June 18, 2014, Billboard estimated that Ultraviolence would sell approximately 175,000–180,000 copies during the first week of its release in the United States. The album debuted at number one on the Billboard 200, with sales of 182,000, making it Del Rey's first number-one album in the US and responsible for a career-best sales week. After two weeks, Ultraviolence sold over 220,000 copies in the US; at the time of release, it held the record for the largest album sales debut by a female artist in 2014, until was overtaken by Taylor Swift's 1989 in November. The album went on to sell over 31,800 vinyl copies in the US, making it the eighth best-selling vinyl album in the US in 2014. Overall, Ultraviolence debuted at number one in 12 countries, including the United Kingdom, making it her second consecutive number-one album, following Born to Die. Ultraviolence was certified gold in Canada on June 25, 2014. The album sold over 880,000 copies worldwide in its first week, and 1 million copies worldwide within a month of release. In August 2014, the album was certified gold in both the UK and Australia. In February 2015, the album was certified Gold in the US for shipments of over 500,000 units.

 Track listing 

Sample credits
 "Ultraviolence" interpolates elements of "He Hit Me (And It Felt Like a Kiss)" by The Crystals.
 "Old Money" interpolates "What Is a Youth?" composed by Nino Rota and performed by Glen Weston from the album Romeo & Juliet: The Soundtrack.

Notes
  signifies a vocal producer

 Personnel 
Credits adapted from the liner notes of Ultraviolence''.

Performance credits

 Lana Del Rey – vocals ; background vocals 
 Dan Auerbach – background vocals 
 Seth Kauffman – background vocals 
 Alfreda McCrary Lee – background vocals 
 Ann McCrary – background vocals 
 Regina McCrary – background vocals 

Musicians

 Dan Auerbach – claps ; electric guitar ; shaker, 12–string acoustic guitar ; synthesizer 
 Collin Dupuis – drum programming ; synthesizer 
 Brian Griffin – drums 
 Ed Harcourt – piano 
 Tom Herbert – bass guitar 
 Seth Kauffman – synthesizer, claps ; electric guitar ; omnichord ; percussion 
 Nikolaj Torp Larsen – philicorda, mellotron 
 Leon Michaels – claps ; synthesizer ; piano ; mellotron ; tambourine, percussion, tenor saxophone 
 Nick Movshon – claps ; bass guitar ; upright bass ; drums 
 Rick Nowels – piano 
 Russ Pahl – pedal steel guitar ; electric guitar ; acoustic guitar 
 Blake Stranathan – guitar 
 Pablo Tato – guitar 
Leo Taylor – drums 
 Kenny Vaughan – electric guitar ; acoustic guitar ; synthesizer, mellotron 
 Maximilian Weissenfeldt – claps ; drums 

Technical and production

 Dan Auerbach – production ; mixing 
 Julian Burg – additional engineering 
 Vira Byramji – assistant engineer 
 John Davis – mastering 
 Lana Del Rey – production 
 Collin Dupuis – engineering ; mixing 
 Paul Epworth – production 
 Lee Foster – production 
 Milton Gutiérrez – engineering 
 Daniel Heath – production, arrangement 
 Phil Joly – engineering ; tracking engineer, mixing 
 Greg Kurstin – production, mixing 
 Neil Krug – photography
 Mat Maitland – design
 Matthew McGaughey – orchestration 
 Kieron Menzies – vocal engineering 
 Rick Nowels – vocal production ; production 
 Alex Pasco – additional engineering 
 Robert Orton – mixing 
 Myan Soffia – additional photography
 Blake Stranathan – production 
 Matt Wiggins – engineering 
 Andy Zisakis – assistant engineer

Charts

Weekly charts

Year-end charts

Certifications

Release history

See also 
 List of Billboard 200 number-one albums of 2014

Notes

References 

2014 albums
Albums produced by Dan Auerbach
Albums produced by Greg Kurstin
Albums produced by Paul Epworth
Albums produced by Rick Nowels
Albums recorded at Electric Lady Studios
Concept albums
Dream pop albums by American artists
Interscope Records albums
Interscope Geffen A&M Records albums
Lana Del Rey albums
Psychedelic rock albums by American artists